Giannis Anestis (born 9 March 1991) is a Greek professional footballer who plays as a goalkeeper for Super League club Panetolikos.

Career

Panionios
He started playing football at Panionios' youth team, and was promoted to the first team in 2010.
His first appearance was on 21 April 2013 against Olympiacos in Karaiskakis Stadium. Panionios lost the match 2–1.

AEK Athens
On 23 January 2014, Anestis signed a three-year contract with AEK Athens for an undisclosed fee, starting at the end of 2013–14 season. He played as the basic goalie in the successful 2014–15 campaign when AEK Athens won the championship and promoted in the Super League. At the summer of 2015, AEK has signed with Venezuelan international goalie Alain Baroja who will start as a first choice for Traianos Dellas squad.

On December 21, 2015 he made his debut with AEK Athens in the Super League as a replacement of injured Alain Baroja who suffered a finger injury on December's training and will remain out of action for at least one month. Anestis, had played only in Greek Cup so far this season. In this game he was the negative protagonist as his club due to his mistake suffered a 2–1 home loss against Levadiakos. On 9 January 2016, in his third Super League game helped his club to escape with a 2–1 home win against Skoda Xanthi, as he saved Dani Nieto's penalty kick, helping his club to retain the second place in the league.

Due to the injury of Vasilis Barkas, he started as the first goalie for the 2017–18 season. The remarkable appearances during the first two months of the season, was a passport to be called by Michael Skibbe in the Greece national team for the upcoming crucial games against Cyprus and Gibraltar. On 20 October 2017, was included in UEFA Europa League's team of the week, after his impressive performance at away draw against AC Milan (0–0). "An inspired goalkeeping performance by Anestis helped keep Milan at bay as AEK managed a goalless draw at San Siro. Anestis made eight saves, produced three high claims, and made four clearances.", was written at the official website of UEFA about the 26-year-old international of the Greek club. 

At the beginning of December, according to various sources, the gap between AEK and Anestis for the renewal of his contract seems to be unbridgeable. The international goalkeeper is free at the end of the season and as a result of this economic dispute with the club's administration remained essentially out of Manolo Jimenez's first team. Anestis currently receives about €140,000 per year, but to renew his contract, his agent has asked for a significant increase in his salary, in the range of €100,000-120,000 for each year in order to renew his contract till the summer of 2021. As a result of his dispute with the administration of the club, he lost his position in the squad for the rest of the season. At the end of the season Olympiacos want to replace the experienced Belgian-Italian international goalkeeper Silvio Proto with the Greek goalie whose current contract with AEK expires in the summer of 2018 and it will not be extended.

Hapoel Be'er Sheva
Anestis signed with Israeli champion Hapoel Be'er Sheva for three seasons, for an undisclosed fee. On 2 August 2018, after the game against GNK Dinamo Zagreb for UEFA Champions League 2nd qualifying round, AEK's former goalkeeper has been harshly criticized by the press for his appearance in the 5–0 away loss, and according to reports, the administration of the club even discusses the solution of his co-operation with him.

On 31 August 2018, the club announced that Anestis had been released.

IFK Göteborg
On 26 November 2018, following an unsuccessful passage from Israel, Anestis signed a contract with Swedish club IFK Göteborg till the summer of 2020 for an undisclosed fee.
On 17 February 2019, he made his debut with the club in a 2–0 Svenska Cupen match against Nyköpings BIS. On 15 November 2019, he renew his contract with the club until 31 December 2021 for an undisclosed fee.

Career statistics

Club

Honours
AEK Athens
Super League Greece: 2017–18
Greek Cup: 2015–16
Football League Greece: 2014–15 (South Group)

IFK Göteborg
Svenska Cupen: 2019–20

References

External links

 
 Myplayer.gr Profile

Living people
1991 births
Greek footballers
Greek expatriate footballers
Footballers from Chalcis
Association football goalkeepers
Panionios F.C. players
Proodeftiki F.C. players
AEK Athens F.C. players
Hapoel Be'er Sheva F.C. players
IFK Göteborg players
Panetolikos F.C. players
Super League Greece players
Gamma Ethniki players
Israeli Premier League players
Allsvenskan players
Expatriate footballers in Israel
Greek expatriate sportspeople in Israel
Greek expatriate sportspeople in Sweden
Expatriate footballers in Sweden